Ljótólfr is a minor character in the mediaeval Orkneyinga saga, who is purported to have flourished in the mid-12th century. The Orkneyinga saga was compiled in about 1200, and documents the reigns of the earls of Orkney. It depicts Ljótólfr as a nobleman who lived on the Outer Hebridean Isle of Lewis. During the 12th century, the Hebrides formed part of the Kingdom of Mann and the Isles.

The Orkneyinga saga relates how Ljótólfr was a friendly acquaintance of the Viking chieftain Sveinn Ásleifarson, who is one of the major characters of the entire saga. The saga states that Ljótólfr housed Sveinn for some time on Lewis, and took in Sveinn's brother, who was banished from Orkney. Ljótólfr's son, Fugl, appears in the saga, although he is depicted at being at odds with Sveinn, until a relative of Fugl's negotiates peace between the two. Several historians have considered Ljótólfr to be an ancestor of Clan MacLeod; one of these considered Ljótólfr to be the eponymous ancestor of the clan—although the current understanding of the clan's ancestry regards another man as the eponym.

Background

Ljótólfr is a minor character in the Orkneyinga saga. He is purported to have flourished in the mid-12th century, and to have lived on the Outer Hebridean Isle of Lewis. Ljótólfr has a son, Fugl, another minor character in the saga, who is also described as being from the island.

Sources

The main source for Ljótólfr is the Orkneyinga saga, which was compiled sometime around 1200 by an unknown Icelander. The saga is thought to have been based upon poetry, oral tradition, and other written material. It can be summed up as an account of the lives of many of the earls of Orkney between the 9th and 13th centuries. According to research fellow Ian Beuermann, the saga is useful not for the specific events it describes, but rather for what it reveals about "the ideas shaping the texts during the periods of composition or revision". For example, it is possible that even one of the main characters of the saga, Sveinn Ásleifarson, never existed, or at least that the historical Sveinn differed from the saga's portrayal of him. Another source which mentions Ljótólfr is Þormóður Torfason's 17th-century Latin history of Orkney, which follows the Orkneyinga saga.

The Hebrides in the 12th century

In the 11th century, the earls of Orkney were at the height of their power. The Earl of Orkney, Þórfinnr Sigurðarson, also ruled Caithness and Sutherland, and seems to have controlled the western seaboard of Scotland, and the Hebrides. Historian Magnús Stefánsson described the political situation of the Hebrides and the Isle of Man during the 11th and early 12th century as being unstable, and suffering from the rivalries of petty kings and chieftains. In 1079, the Hebridean warlord Gofraidh Crobhán was able to unite the Hebrides and the Isle of Man into an effective independent kingdom. In 1098–9, the Norwegian king Magnús Óláfsson invaded the Hebrides, and asserted his right over the islands; he did so again in 1102–3. He is thought to have planned to unite Orkney, the Hebrides, and the Isle of Mann, under the control of his son. In 1103, Magnús was slain in Ireland, and no Norwegian king set foot in the islands for over a century and a half. With Magnús' death, the Outer Hebrides were brought back under the control of the Kingdom of Mann and the Isles, whose kings tactfully recognised Norwegian sovereignty. In 1156, the kingdom was partitioned following an inconclusive sea battle between the warlord Somhairle mac Gille Brighde, and the Manx king Gofraidh mac Amhlaibh: the Outer Hebrides remained under the control of Gofraidh, but the Inner Hebrides were ruled separately by Somhairle. Two years later, Somhairle successfully invaded the Isle of Man, took the throne, and ruled the entire Kingdom of Mann and the Isles until his death in 1164.

Ljótólfr in the Orkneyinga saga

One of the most prominent characters of the Orkneyinga saga is the Viking chieftain Sveinn Ásleifarson, who lived on the island of Gairsay, in Orkney. The saga relates how Sveinn's father, Óláfr Hrólfsson, was one of several chieftains who supported Páll Hákonsson, Earl of Orkney, in a victorious sea battle against a fleet led by Ölvir Rósta in support of Rögnvaldr Kolsson, who had been appointed the earl of half of Orkney by the King of Norway. Óláfr was later burned to death inside his own house by Ölvir, the grandson of Frakökk, an ambitious woman, portrayed as a villain in the saga. Frakökk attempted to win the Earldom of Orkney for her descendants—particularly Ölvir.

The saga relates how in Orkney, Sveinn murdered one of the earl's followers, and immediately fled to the Bishop of Orkney. The bishop protected Sveinn by sending him away to the Suðreyjar, into the care of Holdboði Hundason, a chieftain on the Inner Hebridean island of Tiree. Later, in early spring, the saga relates how Sveinn travelled to Atholl, where he stayed for a long period of time. From Atholl, Sveinn made his way back towards Orkney by land, and on the journey northwards, he passed through Thurso, in Caithness. The saga notes that Sveinn was accompanied by Ljótólfr, and that Sveinn had spent much of the previous spring with Ljótólfr. The chieftain who lived at Thurso was an earl named Óttarr, who is described as "a man worthy of honour". Earl Óttarr was a brother of Frakökk, and the saga relates how Ljótólfr negotiated a truce between Sveinn and Earl Óttarr, after Sveinn's father was killed by Ölvir.

The saga states that Sveinn made numerous Viking expeditions throughout the Hebrides, and into the Irish Sea zone. On one such occasion, Sveinn set up a base on the Isle of Man, where he married a wealthy widow. Some time later, Sveinn and his men were attacked by a force led by Holdboði, and in consequence Sveinn left the island and sailed north into the Hebrides to Lewis.

Further on in the saga, it is stated that Sveinn's brother, Gunni Óláfsson, had children with Margrét Hákonardóttir, mother of Haraldr Maddaðarson, Earl of Orkney, Mormaer of Caithness. Because of this relationship with his mother, Haraldr banished Gunni from the earldom, and enmity arose between Sveinn and the earl. Sveinn then sent Gunni to stay with Ljótólfr on Lewis, with whom Sveinn himself had stayed at an earlier time. The saga also states that at this time, Ljótólfr's son, Fugl, was with Haraldr, and consequently there was a "coldness" between Fugl and Sveinn. The saga relates that Sveinn stole a ship from Fugl, who had been travelling to Orkney to meet Haraldr. However, subsequently a relation of Fugl's, named Anakol, who became a friend of Sveinn, succeeded in making peace between the two. Historian Garreth Williams noted that Anakol's name is Gaelic in origin, and like Ljótólfr and Fugl, he is described as being originally from the Hebrides. The saga also states that he was from a good family.

Links to Clan MacLeod

Captain F. W. L. Thomas, a 19th-century antiquarian, proposed that Ljótólfr was the eponymous progenitor of Clan MacLeod. However, today the accepted understanding is that the clan's eponymous ancestor is another man, Leod, who flourished about a century after Ljótólfr. Leod's name, and the modern surname MacLeod, are considered to be ultimately derived from the Old Norse personal name Ljótr. This name is derived from the Old West Norse word ljótr, meaning "foul", "ugly", "misshapen" or alternatively “shining”, “bright”. The personal name Ljótólfr is composed of two elements—the first, liút, is derived from the Germanic word meaning "light", "shining"; the second element, ólfr, is derived from a Germanic word meaning "wolf". While the current understanding of Leod's ancestry does not include a man named Ljótólfr, the 20th-century clan historian Alick Morrison considered it possible that Ljótólfr could be an ancestor of Leod, albeit on his distaff side; Morrison even suggested that Leod's name could have been derived from Ljótólfr.

The MacLeods have two main branches—Sìol Thormoid (Scottish Gaelic: "seed of Tormod") and Sìol Thorcaill ("seed of Torcall"). Sìol Thorcaill was the dominant family on Lewis from the Late Middle Ages until the end of the 16th century. The Gaelic names Tormod and Torcall are derived from the Old Norse names Þórmóðr and Þórketill. Thomas noted that these names were also those of two men with Lewis connections, who are both recorded in the 13th-century kings' saga Hákonar saga Hákonarsonar. One of these men was Þórketill Þórmóðsson, who according to the saga, was slain near the Isle of Skye in about the year 1230. Thomas proposed that this man could be a grandson of Ljótólfr. Another man who appears in the saga, Þórmóðr Þórkelsson, was forced to flee Lewis, leaving behind his wife, retainers, and goods; according to Thomas, this shows that Þórmóðr was a resident on the island. Thomas noted that Þórmóðr Þórkelsson was married in about 1231, and on the assumption that each generation could be estimated to be 30 years, Thomas gave Þórmóðr's birth at 1201; his (supposed) father, Þórketill, at 1171; Þórketill's father Þórmóðr at 1141; and this man's father at 1111. Thomas concluded that the elder Þórmóðr would have been born at about the time Ljótólfr flourished on Lewis.

See also
History of the Outer Hebrides

Notes

References

Bibliography

 

12th-century Norwegian people
12th-century Scottish people
Clan Macleod
Isle of Lewis
Scandinavian Scotland
Orkneyinga saga characters